The bone marrow of animals is widely used by humans as food. It consists of yellow marrow contained in long bones. There is also red marrow, which contains more nutrients than yellow marrow. It may be found in bone-in cuts of meat purchased from a butcher or supermarket.

History
Many cultures have used bone marrow as food throughout history. Some anthropologists believe that early humans were scavengers rather than hunters in some regions of the world. Marrow would have been a useful food source (largely due to its fat content) for tool-using hominids, who were able to crack open the bones of carcasses left by apex predators such as lions and wolves.

European diners in the 18th century often used a marrow scoop (or marrow spoon), often of silver and with a long, thin bowl, as a table implement for removing marrow from a bone. Bone marrow was also used in various preparations, such as pemmican. Bone marrow's popularity as a food is now relatively limited in the western world, but it remains in use in some gourmet restaurants, and is popular among food enthusiasts.

Around the world
In Vietnam, beef bone marrow is used as the soup base for the national staple dish, phở, while in the Philippines, the soup bulalo is made primarily of beef stock and marrow bones, seasoned with vegetables and boiled meat; a similar soup in the Philippines is called kansi. 

In Indonesia, bone marrow is called sumsum and can be found especially in Minangkabau cuisine. Sumsum is often cooked as soup or as gulai (a curry-like dish).

In India and Pakistan, slow-cooked marrow is the core ingredient of the dish nalli nihari. 

In China, pig tibia is used to make slow-cooked soup, with one or both ends of the tibia chopped off. After the soup is done, the marrow would be scooped out with chopsticks. In some restaurants, cooked pig tibia would be served with a drinking straw specifically for sucking out the semi-liquified marrow.

In Hungary, tibia is a main ingredient of beef soup; the bone is chopped into 10–15 cm pieces, and the ends are covered with salt to prevent the marrow from leaking from the bone while cooking. Upon serving the soup, the marrow is usually spread on toast.

Beef bone marrow is also a main ingredient in the Italian dish ossobuco (braised veal shanks); the shanks are cross-cut and served bone-in, with the marrow still inside the bone. Beef marrow bones are often included in the French pot-au-feu broth, the cooked marrow being traditionally eaten on toasted bread with sprinkled coarse sea salt.

In Iranian cuisine, lamb shanks are usually broken before cooking to allow diners to suck out and eat the marrow when the dish is served. Similar practices are in South Asian and Middle Eastern cuisine.

Some Native Alaskans eat the bone marrow of caribou and moose.

In Kathmandu, Nepal, Sapu Mhichā, which is a leaf tripe bag stuffed with bone marrow, is a delicacy served during special occasions. The bag is boiled and fried, and is eaten when the marrow is still molten.

Notes and references 

Offal